Cuckoo Rock to Turbot Point is a coastal Geological Conservation Review site and Site of Special Scientific Interest (SSSI) in Cornwall, England, UK, noted for its geological interest.

Geography
It starts in the west at Manare Point, south of Portloe and ends at Gell Point, passing through the shores at Caerhays Castle.

References

Sites of Special Scientific Interest in Cornwall
Sites of Special Scientific Interest notified in 1998
Cornish coast